The Trip to Italy is a 2014 British comedy film written and directed by Michael Winterbottom. It is the sequel of Winterbottom's TV series The Trip, and similarly stars Steve Coogan and Rob Brydon as fictionalized versions of themselves. The film had its world premiere at the 2014 Sundance Film Festival on 20 January 2014. Following the premiere, a second TV series, also titled The Trip to Italy, was broadcast on BBC Two.

Premise
Rob has been commissioned by a newspaper to go on a road trip through Italy from Piedmont to Capri, partly following in the footsteps of the great Romantic poets. Steve joins him, and as they journey through the beautiful Italian countryside, they contemplate life, love and their careers.

Cast
Steve Coogan as Steve Coogan
Rob Brydon as Rob Brydon
Claire Keelan as Emma
Rosie Fellner as Lucy
Marta Barrio as Yolanda
Timothy Leach as Joe
Ronni Ancona as Donna

Reception
Review aggregator Rotten Tomatoes reports that 86% of 104 film critics have given the film a positive review, with a rating average of 8.2/10. The site's critical consensus reads, "While perhaps not quite as fresh as Coogan and Brydon's original voyage in The Trip, The Trip to Italy still proves a thoroughly agreeable sequel."

Scott Foundas of Variety, said in his review that "Coogan, Brydon and Winterbottom journey to the Mediterranean in this warmly enjoyable continuation of their improvised cultural and culinary adventures." William Goss of Film.com gave the film a generally positive review, saying that it is "plenty enjoyable for fans of the first one and these two", while noting that "by the end, it also has the consistency of reheated comfort food."  Amber Wilkinson of The Daily Telegraph gave the film a B, saying that "Their improvisation has been honed to the point where the jokes land solidly without losing naturalism and the pair of them are clearly enjoying la dolce vita".

References

External links
 
 
 

2014 films
Films set in Italy
Films shot in Italy
Films directed by Michael Winterbottom
British sequel films
British buddy films
British road comedy-drama films
Films about actors
Films about comedians
2010s road movies
Films about travel
Films edited from television programs
2010s English-language films
2010s British films